Indiaporã is a municipality in the state of São Paulo in Brazil. The population is 3,969 (2015 est.) in an area of 280 km². The elevation is 440 m.

References

Municipalities in São Paulo (state)